The following is a list of massacres that have occurred in China. The massacres are grouped for different time periods.

Imperial China (before 1912)

Republic of China (since 1912)

1912–1937

1937–1945 (Sino-Japanese War)

1945–1949 (Civil War)

1949–present

People's Republic of China (since 1949)

1949–1966

1966–1976 (Cultural Revolution) 
Cultural Revolution was launched by Mao Zedong in May 1966, with the help of the Cultural Revolution Group. The estimated total death toll ranges from hundreds of thousands to 20 million, while massacres took place across the country. Some of the massacres occurred during the Violent Struggles (200,000–500,000 deaths), struggle sessions or political purges such as Cleansing the Class Ranks (0.5–1.5 million deaths). In total, some Chinese researchers have estimated that at least 300,000 people were killed in Cultural Revolution massacres. Massacres in Guangxi Province and Guangdong Province were among the most serious: in Guangxi, the official annals of at least 43 counties report massacres with 15 of them recording a death toll of over 1,000, while in Guangdong at least 28 counties report massacres with 6 of them seeing over 1,000 deaths. The following table only includes major massacres which have been well documented in literature.

1976–1999

2000–present

See also 

 List of rebellions in China
 List of Chinese wars and battles

 Mass killings under communist regimes
 Great Chinese famine

References

External links
 "Chronology of Mass Killings during the Chinese Cultural Revolution (1966-1976)" by Song Yongyi

China
Massacres

massacres